"Arlene" is a debut song recorded by American country music artist Marty Stuart. It was released in December 1985 as the first single from the album Marty Stuart. The song reached #19 on the Billboard Hot Country Singles & Tracks chart.  The song was written by Curtis Allen.

Chart performance

References

1985 debut singles
1985 songs
Marty Stuart songs
Columbia Records singles